This article is an outline of terrorist incidents in Pakistan in 2017 in chronological order.

January
21 January - a bomb was detonated at a vegetable market in Parachinar, in the Kurram Valley of the Federally Administered Tribal Areas of Pakistan. At least 25 people were killed and 87 injured by the explosion. Parachinar is the administrative headquarters of the Kurram Agency near the Afghan border.  The same area has previously seen several blasts in 2008, February 2012, September 2012, 2013 and in December 2015.

Chief of Army Staff (COAS) General Qamar Bajwa visited Parachinar and paid a visit to the injured of the bomb blast in Agency Headquarters Hospital.

Lashkar-e-Jhangvi al-Alami and the Pakistani Taliban splinter Shehryar Mehsud group both separately issued a joint claim of responsibility.

Seven suspects were arrested following a search operation after the blast.

February 
12 February - Samaa TV assistant cameraman Taimoor Khan killed in an incident. Tehreek-e-Taliban Pakistan claimed the responsibility.
13 February - A blast outside the provincial assembly in Lahore killed at least 14 people including DIG Police and SSP Operations and injured more than 87 others.
15 February - At least two people killed and seven others injured in a suicide blast in Peshawar's Hyatabad area.
15 February - 5 People including 3 Levies personnel killed in a suicide attack in Mohmand Agency.
15 February - 2017 Hayatabad suicide bombing
16 February - Three soldiers killed, including an army captain, two injured in an IED explosion in Awaran.
16 February - At least 88 people were killed and over 350 others injured when a suicide bomber blew himself up in the Shrine of Lal Shahbaz Qalandar in Sehwan, 125 kilometers north of Jamshoro.
17 February Five people, including four police officers, were killed after unidentified suspects opened fire on police van near Mission Mor, Dera Ismail Khan.
21 February Three suicide bombers targeted a sessions court in Tangi, Charsadda District, Khyber Pakhtunkhwa, killing 7 people and injuring more than 20 others.

March
6 March - Five soldiers of Pakistan army and 10 militants were killed in a cross border attack at three border checkpoints in Mohmand Agency.
31 March- At least 25 people were killed and 90 injured in a blast outside a Shia Imambargah in Parachinar.

April
5 April - April 2017 Lahore suicide bombing
7 April - Ashfaq Ahmed, a retired University of Veterinary Sciences professor and Ahmadi civilian, were shot death for assailants in Sabzazar neighborhood, Lahore, Pakistan. Al-Alami faction of Lashkar-e-Jhangvi and the Jamaat-ul-Ahrar faction of Tehrik-i-Taliban Pakistan (TTP) separately claimed responsibility for the attack, but sources also attributed the incident to Aalmi Majlis-i-Tahfuz-i-Khatam-i-Nubuwaat. In 21 May, four assailants from Aalmi Majlis-i-Tahfuz-i-Khatam-i-Nubuwaat were held in relation of the attack.
14 April - 4 Rangers personnel martyred and 3 were injured and Rangers kill 10 TTP militants in operation near DG khan.
25 April - 14, including six children, killed and 9, including 4 Khasadar officials, injured in a roadside blast in Kurram Agency.

May 
12 May -  An attack targeting Abdul Ghafoor Haideri killed 25 people in Mastung District. Islamic State of Iraq and the Levant claimed responsibility of attack.
13 May - 10 laborers were killed after two gunmen opened fire on laborers working in Gwadar.

June 
23 June -  14 people ─ including seven policeman ─ lost their lives, while 19 others were injured in a suicide blast that shook Shuhada Chowk in Quetta's Gulistan Road area on Friday morning.
23 June-  At least 75 people were killed and more than 150 wounded when twin blasts tore through a market in Parachinar. Lashkar-i-Jhangvi al-Alami claimed the responsibility.

July 
10 July - 3 people were killed and over 20 injured when a suicide bomber blew himself up at Bogra Chowk in Chaman, Baluchistan.
24 July- At least 25 people were killed and 53 others wounded in suicide attack in Lahore.

August 
7 August - August 2017 Lahore bombing a truck bombing occurred at Band Road in Lahore, Punjab, Pakistan. Two people were killed and 35 others were wounded.
12 August - A blast targeting military personnel killed 15 people (8 soldiers and 7 civilians) and injured 32 in Quetta, the provincial capital of Balochistan, Pakistan.

October
5 October - 21 people, including a police constable, were killed and more than 30 injured in a suicide bombing at Dargah Pir Rakhel Shah in Fatehpur, a small town in the Jhal Magsi District of Balochistan.
18 October - At least eight people, including seven policemen, were killed and 24 others injured in an explosion targeting a truck carrying police officials in the Sariab Mill area of Quetta.

November
9 November -  A senior police officer was among three suspected militants involved in ISI Clandestine activities who died in a suicide attack on Quetta the provincial capital of Balochistan. However there is no valid argument about the role of operation being performed.

24 November - A motorcycle suicide bomber targeted a police vehicle of AIG Asharf Noor while he was travelling to work, Asharf Noorr and his guard are killed and eight others police in the AIG's squad were injured.

the above reference is for peshawar and not quetta.

December 

 1 December - Nine dead as gunmen storm hostel of Agricultural Training Institute, Peshawar.
 17 December - A bomb killed nine and injured fifty-seven at a Methodist church in Balochistan. The Islamic State of Iraq and the Levant took responsibility.

See also
 2017 in Pakistan
 Terrorism in Pakistan
 List of terrorist incidents, 2017

References

 
2017 in Pakistan
Lists of terrorist incidents in 2017
2017